Hoteps are a subculture of African Americans who use Ancient Egypt as a source of black pride. The community is Afrocentrist and it has also been described as promoting a false history. One of the group's more recognizable beliefs is the theory that the Ancient Egyptians were a racially homogeneous civilization which was uniformly made up of a single ethnic group of Black people, as opposed to the more accepted theory that the Ancient Egyptians were an extremely diverse society, consisting of people who were indigenous to the Egyptian Nile valley, ethnic groups that lived in the desert, Libyans, Sudanese, and eventually Greeks and Arabs after conquests.

Origins 
Although its members are not always called "hoteps", the community originated in response to early 20th century Egyptomania within the black community of the United States, as well as the emergence of Afrocentrism following the civil rights movement (with a later resurgence in the 1980s and 1990s).

The term "hotep" was used among Afrocentrists as a greeting, similar to "I come in peace", but has gained popularity recently on social media sites such as Twitter and Instagram. It later became used to refer to certain Afrocentric communities as a whole, often used disparagingly to "describe a person who's either a clueless parody of Afrocentricity [...] or someone who's loudly, conspicuously and obnoxiously pro-black but anti-progress".

Ideology 
Hoteps have been described as promoting false histories and misinformation about black people and black history. It is generally considered right-wing and socially conservative, and it has also been likened to the alt-right by some critics of it.

Critics of hoteps have accused them of being conspiratorial, black nationalist, anti-feminist, anti-LGBT, anti-Asian and antisemitic. Some critics have argued that hotep beliefs are too narrow-minded (they only focus on Ancient Egypt as opposed to other aspects of African history), and black feminists argue that hoteps perpetuate rape culture by policing women's sexuality and tolerating predatory black men.

See also 
 Black Hebrew Israelites
 Nation of Islam
 Moorish Science Temple of America
 Nuwaubian Nation
 Five-Percent Nation

References 

African-American-related controversies
African-American culture
African and Black nationalism
Afrocentrism
Black Power
Ethnocentrism
Geocultural perspectives
Pan-Africanism
Political neologisms
Pseudohistory